The Hartford Symphony Orchestra (HSO) is an American orchestra based in Hartford, Connecticut.

Overview 

The orchestra presents more than 100 concerts annually to audiences numbering more than 110,000.

The Hartford Symphony Orchestra’s extensive array of Education and Community Activities serves more than 22,000 individuals in Hartford and surrounding communities annually.

The Hartford Symphony Orchestra is supported by nearly 4,500 subscribers and over 2,000 donors. The organization has been greatly strengthened by an extensive level of communication and involvement with its musicians that has become a national model for orchestral governance. Now representing 15% of the board of directors and one-third of its executive committee, musicians also serve on all major Board committees.

History

1930s 

The Federal government established the Federal Emergency Relief Corporation, which included a program to help struggling musicians through the economic depression. Amateur musician and businessman Francis Goodwin II, considered today to be the “Father of the Hartford Symphony,” seized the opportunity to bring orchestral music to the city of Hartford. His Federal “Orchestra Application” was accepted, resulting in the creation of the Hartford Symphony Orchestra, then known as the “Civic Symphony Orchestra of Hartford.” Created as a public service, the orchestra gave two free concerts per week, and the musicians rehearsed every day for a weekly salary of $21. The Civic Symphony Orchestra of Hartford performed its first concert on November 20, 1934, under music director Angelo Coniglione at West Middle School in Hartford.  Although this first concert did not bring in a huge audience, it was generally considered to be a promising start to the orchestra’s future.

The Federal government disbanded the Federal Emergency Relief Corporation in 1935 and instead began a larger program called the Federal Music Project (FMP). This project was a subdivision of the Works Progress Administration (WPA) of the New Deal. Many orchestras in the United States were born out of the funding from this project. To the Hartford Symphony, being a part of the Federal Music Project meant they could pay musicians higher wages and charge a moderate admission of 25¢.

In 1936, Jacques Gordon replaced Angelo Coniglione as conductor and music director and the name of the orchestra officially changed to the “Hartford Symphony Orchestra.” The Symphony’s concerts schedule expanded with performances in The Bushnell, as well as public venues across Connecticut, Massachusetts, and Rhode Island. However, the next year the WPA changed its policies so that orchestras could not charge admission. However, the Hartford Symphony continued to bring in revenue by cleverly charging each patron 10¢ to rent a seat for summer concerts. At the first part of the summer concert that year, Francis Goodwin receives a telegram explaining that the Federal Music Project was changing its policies and that the Hartford Symphony would need to cover half of its own costs or it would lose all Federal funding. Panicked, Mr. Goodwin stood up at intermission and appealed to the audience for its financial support. A box was passed around, and by the end of the concert they had collected $1,200! The next day the contributions continued to roll in, saving the orchestra from financial disaster and initiating the strong connection between the Hartford Symphony and the Hartford community.

In the past the FMP had always had dictated which guest artists and conductors would be allowed to perform. Looking for complete artistic control over the orchestra, the Hartford Symphony pulled out of the FMP in 1938 in order to hire conductor Leon Barzin as the new music director. Despite the Symphony’s poor financial status from a lack of government funding, the orchestra’s four-concert season was the most illustrious the orchestra had ever seen; it featured world-famous soloists and a high ticket revenue from $3 admission prices. In an effort to raise community spirits, the following year the City of Hartford funded five successful summer concerts with guest conductor George Heck at the podium. Bushnell Park’s outdoor bandshell was torn down at the end of this summer series, marking the end of the first decade of the Hartford Symphony’s history.

1940s 

Ever since the decision was made to forgo Federal funding in 1938, the Hartford Symphony had been struggling to keep its doors open. Board member Francis Goodwin, considered to be the “Father of the Hartford Symphony,” even put up $11,000 in personal collateral to finance a loan for the Symphony. (The Symphony was later unable to pay back the loan, and Goodwin’s personal collateral was confiscated.) Despite this financial distress, the Hartford Symphony presented five concerts in the Bushnell which featured all-Beethoven programming. These concerts marked the highest attendance the orchestra had experienced in its six-year history.

The Hartford Symphony played the last of its successful Beethoven concerts on May 14, 1941. By this time, World War II had swept through Europe, and by the fall of 1941 nearly all of the Hartford Symphony’s musicians had taken leave to join the armed forces.  With crippled finances and no musicians, the orchestra only existed as a corporate entity and it did not seem likely that Connecticut would ever hear the Hartford Symphony again.

In a final effort to save the Hartford Symphony, Francis Goodwin pulled together a new board of directors in 1946 composed of prominent Hartford businessmen, including Willard B. Rogers, the Commissioner of the Connecticut Department of Economic and Community Development, as President of the Hartford Symphony Board.

In an unprecedented action, Hartford’s musicians’ union agreed to perform for free for one year in an effort to get the Symphony up and running again.  The Hartford Symphony was then free to use what little funds they had to pay for technical costs. In 1947 they hired two alternating co-conductors: George Heck, Dean of what is now the Hartford Conservatory, and Moshe Paranov, Dean of The Hartt School.

The Hartford Symphony’s first concert back was held on January 25, 1948, in Mortensen Hall.  For the first time, patrons could buy subscriptions ($6 for seats at four concerts in either the Orchestra or Front Balcony section) or pay $1 per concert for a seat in the rest of the house. The audiences were much larger than the Symphony had seen in the past, with more than 1,000 paid admissions at every concert.  After observing this heartfelt struggle to revive the Hartford Symphony, Travelers Insurance Company, in conjunction with radio station WTIC-FM, offered up a generous gift of $30,000 over the course of three years to the Hartford Symphony.  After the first $10,000 installment in 1948, the HSO was finally able to open official administrative offices in the first floor of the Old State House, and, more importantly, was able to pay the musicians scale wages.

The Hartford Symphony’s 1949 – 1950 concert season expanded to six concerts in the Bushnell instead of four. In addition, Arthur Fiedler guest conducted the first Hartford Symphony Pops! concerts at The Bushnell and the Trinity Field House, where audience members sat at cabaret-style tables and were served food and drink by white-coated Trinity Students. It was noted this year that the orchestra played better than ever before; it seemed that musicians and audience members alike had a renewed interest in keeping the Hartford Symphony in business.

1950s 

After the financial growth of the 1940s, the Hartford Symphony was able to perform six traditional concerts in The Bushnell with several nationally and internationally renowned guest performers, including Walton Deckelman, piano; Bela Urban, violin; Joseph De Pasquale, viola; Seymour Benstock, cello; and Cynthia Otis, harp. Odell Shepard, a former Lieutenant Governor of Connecticut, was even invited to narrate Aaron Copland’s A Lincoln Portrait.

The Symphony decided that Fritz Mahler would soon replace Moshe Paranov and George Heck as the new conductor of the Hartford Symphony, with a salary of $7,500 per year. At first, the public was very upset over the decision to hire Fritz Mahler; local newspapers slammed the Symphony for firing the two former Hartford Symphony conductors. On October 28, 1953 Fritz Mahler conducted his first concert with the Hartford Symphony in a program that featured the Boston Symphony’s principal cellist, Samuel Mayes, premiering Kabalevsky’s Concerto for Cello. Although the concert was well attended, there was still backlash from press about new conductor.

Determined to see the Hartford Symphony expand and flourish, Mahler developed educational and outreach programs.  He began his series of “Young People’s Concerts” at The Bushnell, and appointed Mrs. Rena Oppenheimer as Educational Director. She traveled to local grade schools to present instrument demonstrations and promote the “Young People’s Concerts.” Mahler also started the “Hartford Little Symphony”- a reduced orchestra that would play run-out concerts at Avon Old Farms School, Miss Porter’s School, the Duffy School, and the Verplank School.

Mahler infused a sense of variety into the Symphony’s programming with performances of Prokofiev’s Alexander Nevsky, J. Strauss’ Die Fledermaus, an all-Tchaikovsky program, a performance of “Show Boat,” two Pops! concerts, and a program entitled “Theater in the Dance,” featuring the José Limón Dancers with Pauline Koner (Mrs. Fritz Mahler) as a soloist.  In 1954, the Hartford Symphony performed the American premiere of Carl Orff’s Carmina Burana.  After hearing the piece for the first time, audiences jumped to their feet with standing ovations and the local papers overflowed with excellent reviews.

On March 27, 1957 the Symphony recorded Carmina Burana on the Vanguard record label. Fritz Mahler continued the Hartford Symphony’s recording project with the Vanguard label, recording three new albums: Berlioz’s Requiem, Gustav Mahler’s Das Klagende Lied, and Bloch’s Three Jewish Poems for Orchestra and Copland’s Variations for Orchestra & Fanfare for the Common Man.

1960s 

The sixties opened with a general sense of uneasiness amongst the Hartford Symphony administration over the symphony’s lack of growth in the past few years.  Newly elected Hartford Symphony President Francis Goodwin, who is considered to be the “Father of the Hartford Symphony,” was determined to make the Hartford Symphony the “really great orchestra” he had always dreamed it could be. Although the Symphony had received local accolades for its recent accomplishments, it had not yet reached the status Goodwin felt it could achieve.

The Hartford Times and Hartford Courant gave mediocre reviews to the Symphony’s opening concerts of the 1961–62 season; more people began to subscribe to the Bushnell’s concert series instead of the Symphony’s because they believed the Hartford Symphony’s performances were mediocre in comparison. Insisting that they would be able to provide better programming if more funds were available, Goodwin initiated a new fundraising campaign, headed by former Symphony president Albert Holland.  The campaign was a great success: the Orchestra raised $100,000 in one year.

Although the public was enamored with everything Music Director Fritz Mahler had done for the Symphony, the general consensus within the administration and musicians was that Mahler was no longer a good fit for the HSO.  Mahler was constantly traveling overseas to conduct foreign orchestras and seemed no longer committed to the growth of the Symphony. When it became apparent that the board wanted to hire a new conductor, the public was outraged. Despite growing controversy over removing Mahler, Goodwin and the board announced that they wanted to hire a new Music Director- someone who played an instrument, who would hire local players, and, most importantly, who would commit themselves to the nitty-gritty business details of the orchestra. After conducting a wide-sweeping national search, they picked Arthur Winograd, the founding cellist of the Juilliard Quartet, to be the Symphony’s new music director. The Symphony rose to a new level under Winograd.  Concerts for the 1965–66 season were packed and the Symphony saw a 15% increase in subscriptions, surpassing the Bushnell’s subscription sales.

As part of the national “Ford Challenge Grant” program for performing arts organizations, the Ford Company awarded the Hartford Symphony a grant of $1,350,000 in 1966.  Ford saw the Hartford Symphony as an exemplary local orchestra, with “special potential” and “qualities of vision and realism shown by plans for the coming decades.” Needless to say, this gift launched the Symphony into uncharted financial success.

In 1967, the Hartford Symphony Orchestra was invited to perform in New York City at Lincoln Center and Carnegie Hall. The New Yorker published the following review of the Hartford Symphony after one of their performances in Carnegie Hall: “[The Hartford Symphony is] exceeded in refinement, tone, and everything else that makes a great symphony orchestra only by the big four of Boston, New York, Philadelphia, and Cleveland…I was amazed by the quality of this ensemble under the baton of Arthur Winograd, who must be a very [gifted] trainer of professional musicians. The orchestra’s intonation is excellent and its tone correspondingly luminous…the high level of performance that evening was a constant delight.”

1970s 

Despite the fantastic successes of the 1960s, the Hartford Symphony was listed by the New York Times as one of 12 American orchestras in serious financial “danger.” The HSO had experienced great ticket sales and generous donations during the 1960s, but operating costs were high and financial failure was imminent once again. The Ford Challenge Grant which had been awarded to the HSO ten years prior stipulated that the HSO needed to raise one million dollars on their own in order for Ford to donate the $1,350,000 award.  At the end of 1971, the Symphony was $140,000 short of the one million dollar requirement, even though Ford’s award money had been built into future budgets.  At the last minute, Symphony supporters Francis Goodwin and Harry Robinson each donated $70,000 to the HSO, allowing the orchestra to meet its goal and continue to provide classical music to the City of Hartford.

Financially steady for the first time, the Hartford Symphony expanded their educational series to include four “Young People’s Concerts” in the Bushnell, a “Junior Symphony Series” for junior high students, and a concert series at Connecticut College. These years also brought in the world’s most celebrated soloists, including Benny Goodman, Mitch Miller, Isaac Stern, Leon Fleisher, a young André Watts, Itzhak Perlman, Van Cliburn, Ella Fitzgerald, and a 19-year-old Yo-Yo Ma.

IN 1976, the Symphony presented a special Bicentennial series, featuring popular and brand-new American music on every program. This year also marked the passing of Francis Goodwin, who truly had devoted his life to creating and sustaining the Hartford Symphony.

In October 1978, the musicians went on strike, protesting the reductions of concerts and rehearsal hours. The strike lasted ten days, and ended in late October.

In 1979, the Symphony hired Richard Hayman to conduct the Pops! Series at the Jai-alai Fronton in Hartford.  With Hayman’s appointment came new, innovative Pops! programming, including the incorporation of rock ‘n roll, modern jazz, and international music into the series.

1980s 

The Hartford Symphony continued to bring in the finest guest soloists from around the world, including Andre Watts, piano; Richard Stoltzman, clarinet; Jean-Pierre Rampal, flute; Itzhak Perlman, violin; Emmanuel Ax, piano; and Tony Bennett.  Throughout the eighties, the Symphony would expand and create original new concert series, starting these first couple of years with a Beethoven Festival, “Symphony on Ice,” and “Spring, con Amore.”
 
After leading the HSO for 20 years, Music Director Arthur Winograd announced that this would be his final season.  After a year of stunning performances of works by De Falla, Bartók, Shostakovich, and Berlioz, and incredible guest artists including cellist Mstislav Rostropovich, Winograd handed off his baton. As a search committee combed the country for the new conductor, the 1985 season continued on with a series of guest conductors, including Michael Lankester, an exciting British conductor who was associate conductor of the Pittsburgh Symphony. Lankester thoroughly impressed the Symphony and the public; the next year he was appointed as the new music director of the HSO.

Lankester brought in a new wave of interesting guest artists and adventurous programming, including pianist Horatio Guttierez and 13-year-old violinist Midori, as well as performances of works by Britten, Ives, Rorem, and Harbison. This season was bigger than ever, with Classical and Pops! programs, a new “Discovery” and “Music to Go” series, and community concerts at local high schools. In order to accommodate all these new concerts, the musicians ratified a new contract allowing for 21 full-time “core” musicians who were paid a salary instead of per service. Lankester set a new programming standard, pairing modern, avant-garde music by composers like Martinu, Walton, and Kolb with more traditional works, including Verdi’s Requiem. Ticket sales were outstanding, and the Symphony continued to grow.

Although the Symphony’s audiences were thrilled with the increase in concerts, the musicians were being pushed to play more than they ever had before.  Many of the “core” musicians had experienced performance injuries, and there were ambiguities with pay rates between orchestra members. All performances came to a grinding halt during an 11-week impasse; at the end of the year the HSO finally negotiated new contracts where the work schedule became much more reasonable. The Hartford Symphony opened its doors once again on January 18, 1989. After that, it seemed that Hartford’s thirst for classical music could not be quenched. This year the Symphony started five new series: “Classical Conversations,” “Symphonikids” in-school concerts, Family concerts, a completely sold out series in local churches called “Music in a Gothic Space,” and a brand new set of summer concerts.

1990s 
Hartford Symphony Music Director Michael Lankester continued to grow the orchestra's presence in the Hartford community by starting the “Classical Conversations” series, a program designed to help familiarize HSO audiences with the personal lives of their beloved composers. Lankester expanded the Family and Children’s Concerts, even writing much of the music for these programs himself.

Ever since the 1988 contract negotiations there had been tension between the musicians and the administration, and in 1991 the problems finally came to a head. As the result of a contract dispute, the orchestra hit a work impasse and the Symphony was forced to cancel the 1991–92 season. Fourteen months later, a compromise was reached and the HSO went back to work.

After the cancellation of the 1991–92 season, new subscriptions were low and the prospects of a 1992–93 season looked shaky. In the face of this challenge, the HSO got creative, not despondent.  With budget and staff restructuring and greater initiative by the musicians, the orchestra pulled through and kept music in Hartford.  The Symphony opened its 50th-anniversary season in 1993 with a fanfare written by Maestro Lankester.

Where there had been tension and dispute, now the musicians, board, and staff were working hand in hand to keep the Symphony alive.  The symphony initiated new fundraising efforts to expand endowment, increase subscriptions, and balance the budget. This year the HSO began a new Chamber Orchestra series, the “Signature Series.”

In 1996, the HSO held its first trial season of the HSO’s summer series, the Talcott Mountain Music Festival.

In 1997 the HSO finally worked its way back to achieving a balanced budget after the financial and administrative struggles earlier that decade. This recovery was due not only to increasingly effective marketing, but also to steady growth in the orchestra’s artistic quality, balanced programming, increased emphasis on music and cultural education, and fresh, skillful, and professional management.

The HSO opened the 1997–98 season with a Masterworks concert featuring Stravinsky’s oratorio, Oedipus Rex, with a massive choir and a theatrical stage set. This year’s guest artist roster included pianists Leon Fleisher and Garrick Ohlsson, cellist  Ralph Kirshbaum, and actor Christopher Plummer.

Michael Lankester announced in 1999 that he would be leaving the HSO. To celebrate the retirement of their music director, the symphony invited some of the greatest artists of the time to perform, including Yo-Yo Ma, Yefim Bronfman, Marvin Hamlisch, Krystof Penderecki, Ute Lemper, and Captain Kangaroo. At the close of this tumultuous decade, the symphony turned an eye to the future and began the search for the new leader of Connecticut’s orchestra.

2000s 
The HSO launched a major community initiative in 2000 designed to reach new audiences with “I Have a Dream,” the HSO's first concert celebrating the life and legacy of Martin Luther King Jr., and named for his 1963 "I Have a Dream" speech. In addition, the orchestra was invited for the first time to tour with the popular tenor Andrea Bocelli; together they performed 15 concerts in cities across North America.

After a three-year search, the HSO announced the appointment of its new music director, Edward Cumming, who told Connecticut to “Expect the Unexpected.” This new appointment invigorated the orchestra, and fresh programming brought in huge crowds. With this change also came a change of attitude: Cumming wanted the HSO to be an orchestra for the people of Greater Hartford, and the programming should reflect this. With this in mind, the Symphony embarked on a mission to connect with the immediate community of Hartford, starting with a Martin Luther King Jr. Tribute concert and a new Latino Music Festival.

The League of American Orchestras awarded the Hartford Symphony Orchestra the 2003 ASCAP award for Adventurous Programming of Contemporary Music. The Hispanic Professional Network recognized the HSO's "dedication to promote awareness of Hispanic arts and culture". In addition, the HSO joined a distinguished roster of orchestras to receive two special honors: major funding from MetLife Foundation's "Music for Life" program and an invitation to join the "Sustaining the American Orchestra" initiative organized by The Kennedy Center and funded by SBC.

The HSO was one of three orchestras in North America to be honored with the 2004 MetLife Award for Excellence in Community Engagement.  The Symphony went on tour once again with Andrea Bocelli, and was awarded the Governor's Arts Award "in recognition of remarkable artistic achievement and contributions to the arts in the state of Connecticut."

In 2005, the HSO toured with Andrea Bocelli for a third time, continuing to bring the orchestra national acclaim. For its innovative programming at home in CT, the Connecticut Natural Gas presented the orchestra with its Diversity Award.

World-renowned cellist Yo-Yo Ma joined Edward Cumming and the HSO for the opening concert of the 2007–08 season.  After a landmark year of diverse programming, the League of American Orchestras awarded the HSO its ASCAP award for Adventurous Programming of Contemporary Music for the second time in four years.

The HSO’s 65th Anniversary Season was marked by performances of all of Beethoven’s Symphonies, performed in The Bushnell’s intimate Belding Theater.  This year also marked the HSO’s most successful Talcott Mountain Music Festival of all time.

In 2009, Cumming announced that his final season as music director would be in 2010–11; thus began a two-year music director search to find his replacement.

2010s 

From 2009 to 2011 the HSO led a very public music director search which brought six music directors from around the county to Hartford to each guest conduct the orchestra. The final candidate made the biggest impression and was hired immediately following her appearance with the HSO. In January 2011, the HSO announced that Carolyn Kuan, formerly of the Seattle Symphony Orchestra, would be the next music director, starting from the 2012 season. She was the youngest individual and first woman to be awarded this title.

The 2011–12 season opened with a free concert called "Picnic in the Park" which featured performers and repertoire that would be featured on Kuan's inaugural season. From there, the HSO launched a series of new community initiatives, including CityMusic, an El Sistema inspired after school music program in Hartford.

In 2012, the HSO received a Getty grant to launch the Musicians Care Project, which seeks to enhance the quality of life for people of all ages whose healthcare needs prevent them from taking part in traditional music performances by providing live, interactive musical experiences.

Through a combination of accessible and innovative, community-based programming, the HSO's concert attendance reached a ten-year high point, bringing in new and younger audience members.

In 2014, the HSO entered into a management services alliance with The Bushnell Center for the Performing Arts. Under the agreement, the HSO and The Bushnell remain independent, 501(c) (3) non-profit organizations while The Bushnell provides executive and administrative support to the HSO.

Music Directors
 2011–present Carolyn Kuan
 2001–2011 Edward Cumming
 1985–2000 Michael Lankester
 1965–1984 Arthur Winograd
 1953–1965 Fritz Mahler
 1947–1953 George Heck
 1947–1953 Moshe Paranov
 1938–1941 Leon Barzin
 1936–1938 Jacques Gordon
 1934–1936 Angelo Coniglione

References

External links
hartfordsymphony.org – Official site
Hartford Symphony Facebook Page

Musical groups established in 1934
American orchestras
Tourist attractions in Hartford, Connecticut
Works Progress Administration in Connecticut
Performing arts in Connecticut
Musical groups from Hartford, Connecticut
1934 establishments in Connecticut